In digital photography, the RGBE filter is an alternative color filter array to the Bayer filter (GRGB). It similarly uses a mosaic of pixel filters, of red, green, blue and "emerald" ("like cyan" according to Sony), and so also requires demosaicing to produce a full-color image. It was developed by Sony and so far is used only in the ICX456 8-megapixel CCD and in the Sony Cyber-shot DSC-F828 camera. 

Sony states that the reason for adding the fourth filter color is "to reduce the color reproduction errors and to record natural images closer to the natural sight perception of the human eye".

See also
 Color filter array
 Bayer filter
 CYGM filter
 Foveon X3 sensor

References

Image sensors
Color filter array